Norman Craig Anderson (born July 1, 1938) is an American former professional baseball pitcher, who played Major League Baseball (MLB) for the St. Louis Cardinals and New York Mets for all or parts of four seasons (1961–1964).

Scholastic career

Anderson attended Anacostia High School from 1953 to 1956. He played football, basketball, and baseball.

Anderson attended Lehigh University, playing both varsity football and varsity baseball. He graduated with a bachelor's degree in Business Administration in 1960 and then went on to earn an M.Ed. in Business Education from Southern Illinois University Carbondale in 1966.

Playing career

Anderson signed with the Cardinals as an amateur free agent prior to the  season. He made his MLB debut on June 23, 1961.  

Anderson was selected by the Mets in the 1961 MLB Expansion Draft, on October 10, 1961. He played – with the Mets. Anderson led the 1962 Mets in appearances and saves. It was a team that ended up with a record of 40–120, the most losses by any Major MLB team in one season.

On May 12, 1962, Anderson was the winning pitcher on both ends of the first double-header the Mets ever won. After winning those two games against the Milwaukee Braves, he lost his last 16 decisions that season. (The losing streak would end at 19 games when Anderson's big league career ended, on May 31, 1964.) In that twin-bill, he became the first Mets pitcher to record two wins in a single day; only two other Mets pitchers since have accomplished this: Willard Hunter and Jesse Orosco.  

On September 18, 1963, Anderson was the losing pitcher in the last baseball game ever played at the Polo Grounds, when the Philadelphia Phillies, behind lefty Chris Short, beat the Mets 5–1.

In 82 games (17 starts), Anderson finished with a career record of 7 wins, 23 losses, 94 strikeouts, 192.1 innings pitched, 34 games finished, and an earned run average (ERA) of 5.10.

References

External links

Craig Anderson at SABR (Baseball BioProject)
Craig Anderson at Baseball Almanac
Craig Anderson at Baseball Gauge
Craig Anderson at Baseball Library
Craig Anderson at Ultimate Mets Database

Living people
1938 births
Baseball players from Washington, D.C.
Buffalo Bisons (minor league) players
Indianapolis Indians players
Jacksonville Suns players
Lehigh Mountain Hawks baseball players
Lehigh University alumni
Major League Baseball pitchers
New York Mets players
People from Southeast (Washington, D.C.)
Portland Beavers players
St. Louis Cardinals players
Southern Illinois University alumni
Tulsa Oilers (baseball) players
Williamsport Mets players